David Giancola (born June 24, 1969) is a Vermont-based American Filmmaker. Born in Rutland, Vermont he has Directed, Produced, and/or functioned as Director of Photography on over 35 feature films as of December 2019.

Career 
Giancola's first short film was an adaptation of the comic-book The Spirit, made with the blessing of comic-book legend Will Eisner featuring original artwork from the master cartoonist. Later at age 19, with no film-school training, he wrote and directed his first feature, the meager-budgeted (now cult) sci-fi film Time Chasers. Giancola then directed over twenty feature films and TV-movies including Icebreaker, Lightning - Fire From The Sky, Moving Targets, Landslide, and Moonlight & Mistletoe. He was elected an IATSE 600 Cinematographer in 2002 and ran both the boutique editing facility Post Monsters as well as the lighting/grip rental company New England Light & Grip.

Giancola cast the likes of Jessie Eisenberg, Chris Evans, Kate Bosworth, Paul Dano, Josh Peck, Todd G. Hutchinson, and even Billy Ray Cyrus in their first starring roles. He has also directed the likes of Bruce Campbell, Stacy Keach, Sean Astin, Morgan Fairchild, James Coburn, and Tim Blake Nelson. In 2005, he attempted to continue his out-of-the-box casting style with the campy comedy Illegal Aliens starring WWF wrestler Chyna and Anna Nicole Smith in her last performance. The film was a disaster due to the overdose death of Smith and her son (who is credited as a co-producer) and flopped badly. Later, (using extensive behind-the-scenes footage) Giancola turned his ill fortune into the critically acclaimed Documentary; Addicted To Fame (2012) which the late Roger Ebert called; “Probably the best movie about the making of a B-Movie ever made”.

Giancola’s first film, Time Chasers, that garnered him his largest fan base. The film continues to be popular around the world as T-Shirts, Soundtrack CDs, DVDs and other merchandise continue to be gobbled up by fans of the cult favorite which has been featured on Mystery Science Theater 3000 and on 1600 screens theatrically on RiffTrax. The film was re-released digitally in HD and on Blu-Ray in 2020.

Giancola operates the production company Edgewood Studios which released the Award-Winning Sci-Fi/Action feature Axcellerator in 2020 which stars Ryan Wesen, Sam J. Jones, Sean Young, John James, Maxwell Caulfield, and Laura James. Giancola is also a co-owner of numerous businesses in central Vermont including ventures in commercial and residential real estate.

Filmography
Will Eisner's The Spirit: Ten Minutes (Short) (1989)
Time Chasers ( Tangents) (1993)
Diamond Run (1996)
Pressure Point (1997)
Moving Targets (1998)
Icebreaker (1999)
Swimming on the Moon (a.k.a. Hatch) (1999)
Peril (a.k.a. The Cursed a.k.a. A Woman In Jeopardy) (2000)
Radical Jack (2000)
The Newcomers (film) (2000)
Lightning: Fire from the Sky (2001)
Trapped: Buried Alive (2002)
Frozen Impact
Psyclops (2002)
Killer Flood: The Day the Dam Broke (2003)
Arachnia (2003)
Landslide (2005)
Ice Queen (2005)
Zombie Town (2007)
Illegal Aliens (2007)
Moonlight & Mistletoe (2008)
Addicted to Fame (2012)
Axcellerator (2020)

References

External links
 
 Edgewood Studios
 Interview with David Giancola
Austin Chronicle Interview 2019 - David Giancola
FreakSugar "Axcellerator" Austin Screening Review
"Axcellerator" London Festival Review - Flickering Myth
 Audio Interview at Your Video Store Shelf
Variety - "Addicted To Fame" Review - Dennis Harvey

American film producers
1969 births
Living people
People from Rutland (city), Vermont
Film directors from Vermont